The United States Army Field Band of Washington, D.C. is a touring musical organization of the United States Army. It performs more than 400 concerts per year and has performed in all 50 states of the United States and in 25 countries. Stationed at Fort George G. Meade, Maryland, the Army Field Band consists of four performing components: the Concert Band, the Soldiers' Chorus, the Jazz Ambassadors, and the Six-String Soldiers.

Every four years, the Band leads the first element of the Presidential Inaugural Parade. It has also appeared at The Kennedy Center Honors, three World Series, the Baltimore Orioles' annual home finale, the 1995 Presidential Commemoration of the 50th Anniversary of V-J Day, the 40th Anniversary of D-Day in Normandy, the National Memorial Day Concert, the state funerals of Presidents Reagan and Ford, and the 2002 Winter Olympic Games.

History 
The Field Band was established in 1946 by Lieutenant General Jacob L. Devers, Commanding General of U.S. Army Ground Forces, with the aim of maintaining the link between the United States Army and American public established during World War Two by organisations such as USO and the First Combat Infantry Band.

The band's members had to pass a rigorous audition, with the nucleus of the new organization consisted of musicians from the original First Combat Infantry Band. The new band was named The Army Ground Forces Band. In April 1950, it was renamed the United States Army Field Band.

Their 2020 album, Soundtrack of the American Soldier, was nominated Best Immersive Audio Album at the 63rd Annual Grammy Awards.

Performing ensembles 

Since its inception in 1946, The U.S. Army Field Band has evolved from one main performing ensemble into four separate components, including the original Concert Band.

The Soldiers' Chorus had its origins in the early days of the Concert Band, when members would gather in front of the band during shows and serenade the audience. They featured glee club-style choral arrangements of traditional and popular songs. In 1957, the unit began to audition vocalists specifically for the Chorus. The unit's first full-time female soldier-musicians joined the ranks of the Soldiers' Chorus in 1974.

In the early 1960s, the early stages of a permanent big band began to take shape. The Satin Brass and Studio Band were the first big band component, which performed separately from the Concert Band. In 1969, the Studio Band was recognized as a full-fledged performing component, and was later named the Jazz Ambassadors. 

The Six-String Soldiers is a six-member band focused on contemporary popular music with an emphasis on bluegrass and country. It was formed in 2014 to replace the former resident bluegrass band, The Volunteers.

Commanders 

Col. Jim R. Keene (2015-present)

Ltc. Paul Bamonte (2014-2015) (as acting commander)

Col. Timothy J. Holtan (2011–2014)

Col. Thomas H. Palmatier (2007-2011)Col. Finley R. Hamilton (1999-2007)

Col. Jack Grogan (1991-1999)

Col. William E. Clark (1979-1991)

Maj. Samuel J. Fricano (1974-1979)

Ltc. Hal J. Gibson (1968-1974)

Ltc. Wilmont M. Trumbull (1966-1968)

Ltc. Robert L. Bierly (1960-1966)

Ltc. Chester E. Whiting (1946-1960)

Notable members 
Source:
Steve Gadd - drums  
Raymond Harry Brown - trumpet/flugelhorn 
Jay Saunders - trumpet/flugelhorn
Enrico di Giuseppe - tenor
Joshua Hecht - bass
Paul Horn - flute

See also 

 Jazz ambassadors

References

General references 
 Clark, William E. "The History of The U.S. Army Field Band." PhD diss., University of South Carolina, 2002.
 Whiting, Chester E. The Baton and the Pendulum. Clearfield, PA: Kurtz Brothers, 1963.
 The United States Army Field Band. "Our History." The United States Army Field Band.

Inline citations

External links 

United States
Ceremonial units of the United States military